Jesús de la Rosa (born August 5, 1953) is a former professional baseball player whose career extended from 1969 through 1980. He appeared as a pinch hitter in three games in August  in Major League Baseball for the Houston Astros, collecting one hit in three at bats, a double off Pete Falcone of the San Francisco Giants in the ninth inning of a 5–4 defeat at Candlestick Park on August 3. He advanced to third, then scored his only MLB run on a sacrifice fly by Enos Cabell.

In minor league baseball, de la Rosa was an outfielder, first baseman and third baseman. He appeared in 793 games, mostly in the Astro farm system.

He is the stepfather of former MLB outfielder Danny Bautista.

References

External links

1953 births
Living people
Buffalo Bisons (minor league) players
Columbus Astros players
Covington Astros players
Dominican Republic expatriate baseball players in Mexico
Rosa, Jesús de la
Gold Coast Suns (baseball) players
Houston Astros players
Iowa Oaks players
Knoxville Blue Jays players
Major League Baseball first basemen
Major League Baseball players from the Dominican Republic
Memphis Blues players
Rosa, Jesús de la
Rosa, Jesús de la
Sumter Astros players
Rosa, Jesús de la